Three steamships of Court Line were named Errington Court, as was a motor vessel.

, in service 1909–20
, in service 1925–47
, in service 1950–56

See also

Ship names